Carlos Antonio Salom Zulema (born 15 April 1987) is a Palestinian footballer.

He is considered one of the top 5 players in Matchday 13 of the Thai League 1 in an article by FOX Sports Asia.

Club career
Salom scored a 94th-minute winner over Excursionistas which saw Barracas Central gain promotion to the Primera B Metropolitana. He then went on to sign with Olimpo de Bahía Blanca of the Argentine Primera División.

Controversy 
On September 19, 2017 Mexico was hit by a strong 7.1 earthquake in the state of Puebla which became known as the 2017 Central Mexico earthquake. After the earthquake, where hundreds of Mexicans lost their life mostly due to the collapse of buildings, Carlos Salom stated that he wished he had never gone to play soccer in Mexico, claiming he was forced to migrate to Mexico by his agent. After his statement, locals and Argentinians that live in Mexico strongly criticized him calling him ungrateful. The most noted was the Argentinean naturalized Mexican citizen Damián Zamogilny, who is considered as an iconic player in Puebla F.C. Zamogilny was quoted saying "if Carlos really wants to leave Mexico, he should rescind his contract and leave as soon as possible". Soon after the social media storm, Carlos came out and apologised for his statement. He was relegated from the first team and was sent to play in the reserves after this incident.

International career
Salom was born and raised in Argentina, but has great-grandparents from Palestine. As a result, he was eligible, and called up in March 2016, to the Palestine national football team. Salom scored in his debut for Palestine in a 1-1 friendly draw against Tajikistan in September 2016.

International goals
Scores and results list Palestine's goal tally first.

References

External links
 

1987 births
Living people
Citizens of the State of Palestine through descent
Palestinian footballers
Palestine international footballers
Argentine footballers
Argentine expatriate footballers
Olimpo footballers
All Boys footballers
Cienciano footballers
Unión Española footballers
Deportes Concepción (Chile) footballers
Club Puebla players
Chennaiyin FC players
Barracas Central players
Primera B de Chile players
Chilean Primera División players
Argentine Primera División players
Liga MX players
Carlos Salom
Indian Super League players
Primera Nacional players
Argentine expatriate sportspeople in Chile
Argentine expatriate sportspeople in Peru
Argentine expatriate sportspeople in Spain
Argentine expatriate sportspeople in Thailand
Argentine expatriate sportspeople in India
Expatriate footballers in Chile
Expatriate footballers in Peru
Expatriate footballers in Spain
Expatriate footballers in Thailand
Expatriate footballers in India
Argentine people of Palestinian descent
Association football forwards
People from Río Negro Province